Garden of Storms is the fifth album by Swedish melodic death metal band In Mourning, released on 4 October 2019 via Agonia Records.

Track listing 
Music written by Tobias Netzell and In Mourning. Lyrics by Tim Nedergård and Björn Pettersson.

Credits

Musicians 
 Tobias Netzell – vocals, guitars
 Björn Pettersson – guitars, vocals
 Tim Nedergård – guitars
 Sebastian Svalland – bass
 Joakim Strandberg Nilsson – drums

References 

2016 albums
In Mourning (band) albums